Otto Preißecker also Preissecker (3 August 1898 – 30 May 1963) was an Austrian figure skater who competed in men's singles and pairs. As a single skater, he became a three-time World medalist (silver in 1926 and 1927, bronze in 1925), a three-time European medalist (silver in 1926, bronze in 1925 and 1928), and a three-time national champion (1926–1928). As a pair skater with Gisela Hochhaltinger, he was the 1930 European bronze medalist and a two-time national silver medalist.

Results

Men's singles

Pairs with Hochhaltinger

References

Navigation 

Austrian male single skaters
1898 births
1963 deaths
Figure skaters from Vienna
World Figure Skating Championships medalists
European Figure Skating Championships medalists